"Glass Skin" (stylized GLASS SKIN) is a single by Dir En Grey, released on September 10, 2008 in Japan in a regular and limited edition, the limited copy featuring a bonus live track as well as a sticker of the band and a poster. The single was released as a digital download on September 17, 2008.

"Glass Skin" is one of the two singles to be featured on the album Uroboros, along with its predecessor "Dozing Green". Like its counterpart, the song is re-recorded in English for the album.

The artwork on the cover, booklet, and accompanying promotional materials of "Glass Skin", as well as some artwork used on the official website was created by Osaka-based artist Genta Kosumi.

Music

The first B-side, "Undecided", is a rerecording of a track from band's third album, Kisou. The second B-side, "Agitated Screams of Maggots -Unplugged-", is an unplugged arrangement of the band's 2006 single. Another B-side for the single, included only with the limited edition, is a live version of Ryōjoku no Ame; the recording is from a concert at Yokohama Blitz on May 23, 2008.

Music video
The music video for "Glass Skin" was premiered on MTV in Japan. It is largely computer generated, but features images of the band.

Track listing

* Although "Undecided" is originally credited with Die's composition, this arrangement is credited to the band as a whole.

Personnel

 Dir En Grey – producer, composer
 Kyo – vocals, lyricist
 Kaoru – guitar
 Die – guitar
 Toshiya – bass guitar
 Shinya – drums
 Tadasuke – piano (Track 3)
 Kaoru & Yoshinori Abe - Programming

 Miles Showell – mastering
 Yasushi "Koni-Young" Konishi – recording, mixing
 Akinori Kaizaki – co-recording
 Kazuya Nakajima – live recording
 Taku Hashimoto – live recording
 Genta Kosumi – artwork illustration
 Hiroshi "Dynamite Tommy" Tomioka – executive producer

Chart position

References

2008 singles
Dir En Grey songs
Songs written by Kyo (musician)
2008 songs